Ellis Creek is a stream in Thurston County in the U.S. state of Washington. It is a tributary to Budd Inlet. 

Ellis Creek has the name of Isaac "Ike" Ellis, a local lumberman.

References

Rivers of Thurston County, Washington